Phacellocerina is a genus of beetles in the family Cerambycidae, containing the following species:

 Phacellocerina limosa (Bates, 1862)
 Phacellocerina seclusa Lane, 1964
 Phacellocerina silvanae Julio, 2003

References

Anisocerini